In Egyptian mythology, Khenti-kheti (also spelt Chenti-cheti), was a crocodile-god, though he was later represented as a falcon-god. His name means "foremost retreater".

Origin & Evolution
At earlier times, he was the crocodile god of the region called Athribis in Lower Egypt. This is why, in Egyptian history, he has often been associated with Sebek and is said to be The Owner of Athribis. However, during the New Kingdom, he was shown to be related to Horus and was shaped like a hawk. At that time his name was Horas Khenti-Kheti.

Legend
He could take the form of a giant black bull, named Kemwer. He was later replaced by Osiris, also known as "Osiris, who lived in Athribis".

References

Egyptian gods
Falcon deities
Animal gods
Mythological birds of prey

ca:Llista de personatges de la mitologia egípcia#C